Patrick Henry High School is a four-year public high school in San Diego, California, United States. It is part of the San Diego Unified School District. It is attended by students residing in Del Cerro, San Carlos, Allied Gardens, Mission Valley and the College Area.

Patrick Henry High School is accredited by the Western Association of Schools and Colleges. The  campus includes a counseling center, child development center, computer and science labs, a cafetorium, library and a performing arts theater. The mascot of Patrick Henry High School is the Patriot, a reference to Patrick Henry the American Founding Father.

Patrick Henry High School participates in the Voluntary Ethnic Enrollment Program (VEEP) whereby approximately 600 students travel daily from an underrepresented minority community and are regularly enrolled, full-time students. In 2020, the ethnic composition of the school represented more than 20 ethnic groups, Patrick Henry High School is approximately 39.5% White, 29.8% Hispanic, 15.7% Asian, 8.6% Biracial, 5.8% Black, 0.3% Pacific Islander, 0.2% Not specified, and 0.1% Native American.

History
Patrick Henry High School opened in 1968, and had a grant from the Danforth Foundation as an experimental public school.  Founding Principal Donald W. Giddings designed the curriculum as experimental independent learning around a twenty-minute modular system, independent study and an open campus. Within five years, Patrick Henry became more of a traditional school benefiting from its experimental foundation by the early adoption of advanced placement courses including Art History.

Academics 
In 2019, Patrick Henry High School was ranked in the top 4% of the most challenging public high schools in America (888th of 22,000). The rank was determined by the Challenge Index defined as the number of Advanced Placement, International Baccalaureate or Cambridge tests taken in a year relative to the number of seniors who graduate. Patrick Henry High School offers Advanced Placement and Honors courses in World History, Art History, English, Chemistry, Biology, Calculus. The school offers a modern Visual and Performing Arts program in theater, tech theater, band, orchestra, and choral music. Through a longstanding collaboration with Mesa College, high school students can take introductory college courses for credit. Patrick Henry High School has Engineering Academy to support students’ science, engineering, architecture, design electronics and design interests. In 2017 the school's robotics club, the Patribots, won the For Inspiration and Recognition of Science and Technology (FIRST) San Diego Regional and competed at the international championships in Houston. In 2019, the Patribots won the Utah Regional and competed in international championships.

School Within A School 
Patrick Henry High School offers a School Within A School program focused on psychology and child development classes called the Teaching Academy. The Teaching Academy is specifically designed to prepare students for college and career experiences in teaching and early childhood education.

Athletics
Patrick Henry Athletics participates in the California Interscholastic Federation (CIF) and offers the following programs:

Coed Badminton | Basketball (Boys and Girls) | Boys Baseball | Coed Cross Country |  Girls Field Hockey | Boys American Football | Golf (Boys and Girls) | Coed Ice Hockey | Lacrosse (Boys and Girls) | Rugby (Boys and Girls) | Girls Sideline Cheer | Coed Sideline Cheer | Girls Softball | Soccer (Boys and Girls) | Coed Swimming | Coed Surfing | Tennis (Boys and Girls) | Coed Tennis | Coed Track | Volleyball (Boys and Girls) | Water Polo (Boys and Girls) | Boys Wrestling |

The Patrick Henry High School Varsity Football team led by Ricky Williams, competed in the 1994 CIF Championship, losing to Morse High School 13-0. The Patrick Henry High School Varsity Football team won the Division IV CIF Championship over University City High School on November 26, 2021, for the first football CIF title in school history.

International

Twinning arrangements

The high-school has long established exchange partnerships with the Institution Saint Michel located in Solesmes, France. Common projects were carried out with Saint-Michel for the World Forum Lille where cohorts of Patrick Henry High School students presented their work in France on water pollution and the environmental impact of pesticides.

Notable incidents 
On January 5, 1984, the San Diego Police Department executed a narcotics raid arresting 63 Patrick Henry High School students, who had allegedly sold drugs to an undercover officer posing as a student. On January 3, 2007 the San Diego Police Department executed a narcotics raid resulting in the arrest of 15 students from Patrick Henry and University City High Schools who allegedly sold narcotics to undercover San Diego Police Department officers posing as students.

In October 2011, Patrick Henry elected the nation's first lesbian couple as homecoming king and queen. The story was covered internationally and led to both support and opposition. In February 2012, a teacher allegedly told a female student who asked to go to the bathroom that she would have to urinate in a bucket in a back room, and the student obliged; the teacher was consequently fired. On March 17, 2012, a campus police officer was arrested on charges of auto theft and driving under the influence, after taking the wheel of a shuttle-bus while intoxicated. 

On March 22, 2012, three Patrick Henry students organized a protest to defend their teachers who had recently been terminated by the San Diego Unified School District. Students signed a petition, wrote letters to the Superintendent of the San Diego Unified School District and other members of the school board. Additionally, over 200 students participated in a walk-out for an hour to show their support for their teachers.

Alma Mater 
On our City’s eastern border,

Midst the hills and the sky,

Home of our most Valiant Patriots,

Patrick Henry High.

In our many halls of learning,

On our fields of play,

Goals of excellence and honor,

Always lead the way.

As we march along together,

Let’s be brave and bold.

All hail to Patrick Henry High School,

Hail to the green and gold.
-Thomas Leslie, 1968

Notable alumni
Annette Bening, four time Academy Award nominee, two time Tony Award nominee, and winner of a BAFTA Award, a Screen Actors Guild Award, and two Golden Globe Awards (Class of 1975)
Ariana Berlin, four-time All-American UCLA Bruins gymnast (Class of 2005)
Melissa Berton, 2019 Academy Award for Best Documentary (Short Subject) winner (Class of 1985)
Brandon Bogotay, former National Football League player, kicker, Cleveland Browns and Tampa Bay Buccaneers (Class of 2007)
Dante (Jay Dante Rusciolelli), stand-up comedian, actor, writer, producer, director (Class of 1988)
Garth DeFelice, National Football League referee, officiated Super Bowl XL (Class of 1972)
Hayden Epstein, former National Football League player, kicker, Jacksonville Jaguars and Minnesota Vikings (Attended 1995-96)
Steve Fairchild, former National Football League coach, Colorado State head coach (Class of 1975)
Aaron Harang, former Major League Baseball pitcher (Class of 1996)
Tony Harnell, singer–songwriter for 1980s hard rock band TNT (Attended 1977-78)
Eric Helfand, former Major League Baseball player, catcher, Oakland Athletics (Class of 1987)
Eric Karros, former Major League Baseball player, first baseman, Los Angeles Dodgers, Chicago Cubs, and Oakland Athletics, National League Rookie of the Year, Silver Slugger Award winner, commentator (Class of 1985)
Ken Kocher, former National Football League player, defensive lineman, Green Bay Packers; Arena Football League, Columbus Destroyers (Class of 1998)
 Joel Kramer, former National Basketball Association player, power forward/center, Phoenix Suns (Class of 1973)
Russ Lorenson, actor, singer, composer (Class of 1981)
Ericka Lorenz, US Olympic water polo player (Class of 1999)
Rosemary Bryant (Merims) Mariner, first female military pilot to fly a tactical jet (Class of 1970)
Brian Stokes Mitchell, Tony Award winning actor, singer, and composer (Class of 1974)
Lisa Morton, Bram Stoker Award winning author and screenwriter (Class of 1976)
Matt Nokes, former Major League Baseball player, catcher (Class of 1981)
DeWayne Patmon, former National Football League player, safety New York Giants, (Class of 1997)
Dezmon Patmon, National Football League player, wide receiver Indianapolis Colts (Class of 2016)
David Plaut, Emmy Award winning filmmaker at NFL Films (Class of 1971)
John Rogers, President of San Diego Comic-Con (Class of 1978)
RuPaul (Andre Charles), celebrity drag queen, television judge, recording artist, and model (Class of 1979)(note: RuPaul took his GED and did not graduate with his 1979 classmates.)
Brenda Ann Spencer, incarcerated convicted murderer (Class of 1980) (note: Spencer committed her crime in 11th grade and did not graduate with her 1980 classmates)
Ricky Williams, former National Football League player, running back New Orleans Saints, Miami Dolphins, Baltimore Ravens, Heisman Trophy winner (Class of 1995)
Kellen Winslow Jr., former National Football League football player, tight end, Cleveland Browns, incarcerated convicted sex offender (Attended 1997-99)
Joshua D. Wright, antitrust law expert and former commissioner of the Federal Trade Commission (Class of 1995)
Joanna Zeiger, Olympic and world champion triathlete, and author (Class of 1988)
Sal Zizzo, former professional soccer player, Bundesliga, Major League Soccer, United States men's national soccer team, San Diego Loyal SC (Class of 2005)
David Hensley, Major League Baseball player, infielder, Houston Astros (Class of 2014)

References

External links

High schools in San Diego
Public high schools in California
San Diego
1968 establishments in California
Educational institutions established in 1968